Gadiformes  are an order of ray-finned fish, also called the Anacanthini, that includes the cod. Many major food fish are in this order. They are found in marine waters throughout the world and the vast majority of the species are found in temperate or colder regions (tropical species are typically deep-water). A few species may enter estuaries but only one, the burbot (Lota lota), is a freshwater fish.

Common characteristics include the positioning of the pelvic fins (if present), below or in front of the pectoral fins. Gadiformes are physoclists, which means their swim bladders do not have a pneumatic duct. The fins are spineless.

Timeline of genera

References

 
Taxa named by Edwin Stephen Goodrich
Ray-finned fish orders